Francisco Domingo Dávila Robledo (born 1909 in Mexico City - date of death unknown) was a Mexican hammer thrower who competed in the 1932 Summer Olympics.

References

1909 births
Year of death missing
Mexican male hammer throwers
Athletes from Mexico City
Olympic athletes of Mexico
Athletes (track and field) at the 1932 Summer Olympics
Central American and Caribbean Games gold medalists for Mexico
Competitors at the 1930 Central American and Caribbean Games
Competitors at the 1935 Central American and Caribbean Games
Central American and Caribbean Games medalists in athletics
20th-century Mexican people